Chorley is a town in Lancashire, England. It may also refer to
Borough of Chorley, a local government district containing the town
Chorley (UK Parliament constituency) containing the town

Chorley may also refer to:

Places
Chorley, Alderley, Cheshire, England
Chorley, Cholmondeley, Cheshire, England
Chorley, Shropshire, in the parish of Stottesdon, England
Chorley, Staffordshire, in the parish of Farewell and Chorley, England

Other uses
Chorley (surname)
Chorley F.C.

See also
Chorleywood, Hertfordshire, England